Rick Gitelson (born December 15, 1962, in Washington, D.C.) is an American television and film producer and screenwriter.

Gitelson's writing and producing credits include for TV: Rugrats, Goldie & Bear, Imagination Movers, Handy Manny, LazyTown, Dragon Tales, Recess, and Hey Arnold!; and for film: Whispers in the Dark, A Case for Murder, Becoming Dick and The Family Plan. He co-created Goldie & Bear with Jorge Aguirre.

He won a 2002-2003 Emmy Award and a 1999 Humanitas Award for writing and producing the Nickelodeon television series Rugrats and the 2010 Writers Guild of America Award for Imagination Movers.  He has also received a Vision Award from the National Association for Multi-Ethnicity in Communications, a Genesis Award from the Humane Society, an Imagen Award, and an Environmental Media Award, for his work on Handy Manny.

References

External links

 Interview with Gitelson from Wired

Living people
American television producers
People from Washington, D.C.
American film producers
Screenwriters from Washington, D.C.
1962 births